The Schwarzschild radius or the gravitational radius is a physical parameter in the Schwarzschild solution to Einstein's field equations that corresponds to the radius defining the event horizon of a Schwarzschild black hole. It is a characteristic radius associated with any quantity of mass. The Schwarzschild radius was named after the German astronomer Karl Schwarzschild, who calculated this exact solution for the theory of general relativity in 1916.

The Schwarzschild radius is given as

where G is the gravitational constant, M is the object mass, and c is the speed of light.

History
In 1916, Karl Schwarzschild obtained the exact solution to Einstein's field equations for the gravitational field outside a non-rotating, spherically symmetric body with mass  (see Schwarzschild metric). The  has come to be known as the Schwarzschild radius. The physical significance of these singularities was debated for decades. The Schwarzschild radius is nonetheless a physically relevant quantity, as noted above and below.

This expression had previously been calculated, using Newtonian mechanics, as the radius of a spherically symmetric body at which the escape velocity was equal to the speed of light. It had been identified in the 18th century by John Michell and Pierre-Simon Laplace.

Parameters
The Schwarzschild radius of an object is proportional to its mass. The observable universe's mass has a Schwarzschild radius of approximately 13.7 billion light-years.

Derivation

Black hole classification by Schwarzschild radius

Any object whose radius is smaller than its Schwarzschild radius is called a black hole. The surface at the Schwarzschild radius acts as an event horizon in a non-rotating body (a rotating black hole operates slightly differently). Neither light nor particles can escape through this surface from the region inside, hence the name "black hole".

Black holes can be classified based on their Schwarzschild radius, or equivalently, by their density, where density is defined as mass of a black hole divided by the volume of its Schwarzschild sphere. As the Schwarzschild radius is linearly related to mass, while the enclosed volume corresponds to the third power of the radius, small black holes are therefore much more dense than large ones. The volume enclosed in the event horizon of the most massive black holes has an average density lower than main sequence stars.

Supermassive black hole

A supermassive black hole (SMBH) is the largest type of black hole, though there are few official criteria on how such an object is considered so, on the order of hundreds of thousands to billions of solar masses. (Supermassive black holes up to 21 billion  have been detected, such as NGC 4889.) Unlike stellar mass black holes, supermassive black holes have comparatively low average densities.  (Note that a (non-rotating) black hole is a spherical region in space that surrounds the singularity at its center; it is not the singularity itself.)  With that in mind, the average density of a supermassive black hole can be less than the density of water.

The Schwarzschild radius of a body is proportional to its mass and therefore to its volume, assuming that the body has a constant mass-density.  In contrast, the physical radius of the body is proportional to the cube root of its volume.  Therefore, as the body accumulates matter at a given fixed density (in this example, 997 kg/m3, the density of water), its Schwarzschild radius will increase more quickly than its physical radius. When a body of this density has grown to around 136 million solar masses (_, its physical radius would be overtaken by its Schwarzschild radius, and thus it would form a supermassive black hole.

It is thought that supermassive black holes like these do not form immediately from the singular collapse of a cluster of stars. Instead they may begin life as smaller, stellar-sized black holes and grow larger by the accretion of matter, or even of other black holes.

The Schwarzschild radius of the supermassive black hole at the Galactic Center of the Milky Way is approximately 12 million kilometres.

Stellar black hole

Stellar black holes have much greater average densities than supermassive black holes.

Micro black hole

A small mass has an extremely small Schwarzschild radius. A mass similar to Mount Everest has a Schwarzschild radius much smaller than a nanometre. Its average density at that size would be so high that no known mechanism could form such extremely compact objects. Such black holes might possibly be formed in an early stage of the evolution of the universe, just after the Big Bang, when densities were extremely high. Therefore, these hypothetical miniature black holes are called primordial black holes.

Other uses

In gravitational time dilation 

Gravitational time dilation near a large, slowly rotating, nearly spherical body, such as the Earth or Sun can be reasonably approximated as follows:

where:
  is the elapsed time for an observer at radial coordinate r within the gravitational field;
  is the elapsed time for an observer distant from the massive object (and therefore outside of the gravitational field);
  is the radial coordinate of the observer (which is analogous to the classical distance from the center of the object);
  is the Schwarzschild radius.

Compton wavelength intersection 
The Schwarzschild radius and the Compton wavelength corresponding to a given mass are similar when the mass is around one Planck mass, when both are of the same order as the Planck length.

Calculating the maximum volume and radius possible given a density before a black hole forms 
The Schwarzschild radius equation can be manipulated to yield an expression that gives the largest possible radius from an input density that doesn't form a black hole.

This means the largest amount of water you can have without forming a black hole would have a radius of 400 920 754 km (about 2.67 AU).

See also
 Black hole, a general survey
 Chandrasekhar limit, a second requirement for black hole formation
 John Michell
Classification of black holes by type:
 Static or Schwarzschild black hole
 Rotating or Kerr black hole
 Charged black hole or Newman black hole and Kerr–Newman black hole
A classification of black holes by mass:
 Micro black hole and extra-dimensional black hole
 Planck length
 Primordial black hole, a hypothetical leftover of the Big Bang
 Stellar black hole, which could either be a static black hole or a rotating black hole
 Supermassive black hole, which could also either be a static black hole or a rotating black hole
 Visible universe, if its density is the critical density, as a hypothetical black hole
 Virtual black hole

Notes

References

Black holes
1916 in science